Edward Bishop Elliott (24 July 1793, in Paddington – 30 June 1875) was an English clergyman, preacher and premillennarian writer.

Elliott graduated from Trinity College, Cambridge in 1816, and he was given the vicarage of Tuxford, Nottinghamshire in 1824 then later was made prebendary of Heytesbury, Wiltshire. In 1849 he became incumbent of St Mark's Church, Kemptown, Brighton. Elliott was evangelical, premillennial and an ardent supporter of missions. Thoroughly equipped as a scholar, he spent a lifetime in the study of biblical prophecy.

Edward's most notable work is the eschatological study, Horae Apocalypticae (Hours of the Apocalypse), which Charles Spurgeon referred to as the standard work for commentary on the book of Revelation and the Apocalypse. Elliott held to the historicist view of eschatology that the book of Revelation covers history from the time of the apostle John up to the second advent of Christ.

References

External links

1793 births
1875 deaths
English theologians
19th century in London
English sermon writers
19th-century English Anglican priests
People from Paddington
Alumni of Trinity College, Cambridge
19th-century English non-fiction writers